Herzog Blaubarts Burg ("Duke Bluebeard's Castle") (1963) is a film of the opera Bluebeard's Castle by the Hungarian composer Béla Bartók, written in 1911 to a symbolist libretto by the poet and later film theorist Béla Balázs.  The film was made for West German television, Süddeutscher Rundfunk, and was produced by Norman Foster, who also performs the lead role. The designer was Hein Heckroth who brought in his old friend Michael Powell, for whom he had designed a number of films, to direct it.  The film, which was shot at Dürer Film Ateliers in Salzburg, Austria, was out of circulation for decades because of legal problems.

Balázs' retelling is a modified version of the story of Bluebeard, the wife-killer of legend. In the opera, Bluebeard reluctantly and gradually uncovers the secrets of his psyche to his fourth wife, opening the seven doors in his castle to ultimately reveal the still living previous wives, among whom the horrified Judit must take her place.  The only performers are Norman Foster as Bluebeard and Ana Raquel Satre as Judit, his fourth wife, accompanied by the Zagreb Symphony Orchestra conducted by Milan Horvath. It is sung in German although prints exist with English subtitles. A recent print was made which included Powell's notes on the production, displayed as subtitles.

Bartók's opera, which did not receive its first mounting until 1918, was widely regarded as "unperformable" due to its lack of stage action. Powell and Heckroth turn this quality to their advantage by creating an intense, expressionist psychodrama, where lighting and abstract décor convey the gradual revelation of Bluebeard's inner torment to his last wife.  The vivid colours and semi-abstract, neo-primitive décor designed by Heckroth and his team give the film a suitably oppressive feel.

Notes

External links
 
 
 Herzog Blaubarts Burg reviews and articles at the Powell & Pressburger Pages

1963 films
1963 television films
1963 television plays
1963 musical films
German television films
German musical films
West German films
1960s German-language films
German-language television shows
Films directed by Michael Powell
Films by Powell and Pressburger
Films based on operas
Films based on fairy tales
Television shows based on plays
Opera films
1960s German films
Films based on Bluebeard
Das Erste original programming